Live in Studio: Bosnian Blue is a live album by jazz pianist, composer, conductor, arranger and educator Sinan Alimanović. It was recorded on March 21, 2016, at Studio MGKS BHRT at the 32 International Festival Sarajevo Winter, and released on May 23, 2017 by ŠDC.
 
The album features Alimanović's International Band, consisting of Vladimir Kostadinović (drums), Saša Borovec (bass) and Lejla Alimanović (vocals).

"Metaphorically speaking, American jazz falls on the fertile Bosnian ground and creates beautiful filigree embroidery intertwined with touches of Bosnian Blue tones. That carpet in Alimanović's interpretation becomes a strong link with the original Bosnian soul - that Bosnian Blue feeling which compiles blues, jazz and traditional Bosnian song - sevdalinka under the same roof with the common denominator being the performance of the band. Many have said that Alimanović's jazz paints the portrait of the Bosnian Blue." Dinko H. Sansky

2016 live albums
Live jazz albums